Graverobbers (also known as Dead Mate) is a 1988 American black comedy horror film written and directed by Straw Weisman, and starring Elizabeth Mannino, David Gregory, Lawrence Bockius, Jerry Rector, Judith Mayes, and Kelvin Keraga.

Cast
 Elizabeth Mannino as Nora Mae Edwards
 David Gregory as John Henry Cox
 Lawrence Bockius as Sheriff Porter
 Judith Mayes as Emmaline Strickland
 Jerry Rector as Evan Matthews (as Adam Wahl)
 Kevin Scullin as Reverend Collins
 Kelvin Keraga as Morley the Chauffeur
 Kenneth Giek as Bill Billings
 Nevada Belle as Ma
 Kathleen Margo as Cicely Matthews
 Elizabeth Schram as Her Feet
 Mark McCally as Salesman
 Dawn Carpenter as Donna
 James Brummel as Jimmy, the Dishwasher
 Lars Hundere as Larry

Home media
In June 2018, the film was restored in 2K and released on DVD and Blu-ray by Vinegar Syndrome.

References

External links
 
 

1980s black comedy films
1980s comedy horror films
1988 horror films
American black comedy films
American comedy horror films
Necrophilia in film
1988 comedy films
1988 films
1980s English-language films
1980s American films